In mathematics, Tucker's lemma is a combinatorial analog of the Borsuk–Ulam theorem, named after Albert W. Tucker.

Let T be a triangulation of the closed n-dimensional ball . Assume T is antipodally symmetric on the boundary sphere . That means that the subset of simplices of T which are in  provides a triangulation of  where if σ is a simplex then so is −σ.
Then Tucker's lemma states that T contains a complementary edge - an edge (a 1-simplex) whose vertices are labelled by the same number but with opposite signs.

Proofs 
The first proofs were non-constructive, by way of contradiction.

Later, constructive proofs were found, which also supplied algorithms for finding the complementary edge. Basically, the algorithms are path-based: they start at a certain point or edge of the triangulation, then go from simplex to simplex according to prescribed rules, until it is not possible to proceed any more. It can be proved that the path must end in a simplex which contains a complementary edge.

An easier proof of Tucker's lemma uses the more general Ky Fan lemma, which has a simple algorithmic proof.

Note that in this case  is a disc and there are 4 possible labels: , like the figure at the top-right.

Start outside the ball and consider the labels of the boundary vertices. Because the labeling is an odd function on the boundary, the boundary must have both positive and negative labels:
 If the boundary contains only  or only , there must be a complementary edge on the boundary. Done.
 Otherwise, the boundary must contain  edges. Moreover, the number of  edges on the boundary must be odd.

Select an  edge and go through it. There are three cases:
 You are now in a  simplex. Done.
 You are now in a  simplex. Done.
 You are in a simplex with another  edge. Go through it and continue.

The last case can take you outside the ball. However, since the number of  edges on the boundary must be odd, there must be a new, unvisited  edge on the boundary. Go through it and continue.

Done.

Run-time 
The run-time of the algorithm described above is polynomial in the triangulation size. This is considered bad, since the triangulations might be very large. It would be desirable to find an algorithm which is logarithmic in the triangulation size. However, the problem of finding a complementary edge is PPA-complete even for  dimensions. This implies that there is not too much hope for finding a fast algorithm.

Equivalent results

See also 
 Topological combinatorics

References

Combinatorics
Topology
Lemmas